Blood red is a color.

Blood Red may also refer to:
Blood Red (film), a 1989 American-British Western drama film directed by Peter Masterson
Blood Red (novel), a fantasy novel written by Mercedes Lackey
"Blood Red", a song by Slayer on the album Seasons in the Abyss

See also